Freeman Victor Horner (June 7, 1922 – December 1, 2005) was a United States Army officer and a recipient of the United States military's highest decoration—the Medal of Honor—for his actions in World War II.

Biography 

Horner joined the army from Shamokin, Pennsylvania, in January 1941, and by November 16, 1944, was serving as a Staff Sergeant in Company K, 119th Infantry Regiment, 30th Infantry Division. On that day, in Würselen, Germany, he single-handedly attacked three German machine gun positions and killed or captured the soldiers manning them. For these actions, he was awarded the Medal of Honor a year later, on October 12, 1945.

Horner reached the commissioned officer rank of major and served in the Korean War before leaving the Army. He died at age 83 in Columbus, Georgia. A section of U.S. Route 27 in Cataula, Georgia, as well as Georgia Route 219 in Columbus, Georgia, was named for him. He was married to Joyce Farmer Lott, who cared for him after his 1990 brain aneurysm. He was buried in Arlington National Cemetery, Arlington County, Virginia.

Medal of Honor citation 
Horner's official Medal of Honor citation reads:
S/Sgt. Horner and other members of his company were attacking Wurselen, Germany, against stubborn resistance on 16 November 1944, when machinegun fire from houses on the edge of the town pinned the attackers in flat, open terrain 100 yards from their objective. As they lay in the field, enemy artillery observers directed fire upon them, causing serious casualties. Realizing that the machineguns must be eliminated in order to permit the company to advance from its precarious position, S/Sgt. Horner voluntarily stood up with his submachine gun and rushed into the teeth of concentrated fire, burdened by a heavy load of ammunition and hand grenades. Just as he reached a position of seeming safety, he was fired on by a machinegun which had remained silent up until that time. He coolly wheeled in his fully exposed position while bullets barely missed him and killed 2 hostile gunners with a single, devastating burst. He turned to face the fire of the other 2 machineguns, and dodging fire as he ran, charged the 2 positions 50 yards away. Demoralized by their inability to hit the intrepid infantryman, the enemy abandoned their guns and took cover in the cellar of the house they occupied. S/Sgt. Horner burst into the building, hurled 2 grenades down the cellar stairs, and called for the Germans to surrender. Four men gave up to him. By his extraordinary courage, S/Sgt. Horner destroyed 3 enemy machinegun positions, killed or captured 7 enemy, and cleared the path for his company's successful assault on Wurselen.

See also 

List of Medal of Honor recipients for World War II

Notes

References

External links 
 Photograph of Horner and Truman at the Medal of Honor ceremony October 12, 1945

1922 births
2005 deaths
United States Army personnel of World War II
United States Army Medal of Honor recipients
Burials at Arlington National Cemetery
People from Mount Carmel, Pennsylvania
United States Army officers
World War II recipients of the Medal of Honor
Military personnel from Pennsylvania